Ontholestes is a genus of large rove beetles in the family Staphylinidae. There are at least 20 described species in Ontholestes.

Species
These 21 species belong to the genus Ontholestes:

 Ontholestes asiaticus Smetana, 1959 c g
 Ontholestes aurosparsus Fauvel, 1895 c g
 Ontholestes callistus Hochhuth, 2012 c g
 Ontholestes cingulatus (Gravenhorst, 1802) g b (gold-and-brown rove beetle)
 Ontholestes gracilis Sharp, 1874 c g
 Ontholestes hairaerensis Li & Chen,/1993 c g
 Ontholestes haroldi (Eppelsheim, 1884) g
 Ontholestes hayashii Li, 1992 c g
 Ontholestes inauratus Mannerheim, 1830 c g
 Ontholestes marginalis (Gené, 1836) g
 Ontholestes murinus Linnaeus, 1758 c g
 Ontholestes napoensis Zhuo Yang, Hong-Zhang Zhou, 2012 c g
 Ontholestes oculatus Sharp, 1874 c g
 Ontholestes orientalis Bernhauer, 1906 c g
 Ontholestes paramurinus Li & Chen, 1993 c g
 Ontholestes proximus Kirshenblat, 1936 c g
 Ontholestes rosti Bernhauer, ms c
 Ontholestes simulator Kirshenblat, 1936 c g
 Ontholestes tenuicornis Kraatz, 1859 c g
 Ontholestes tessellatus Geoffroy, 1785 c g
 Ontholestes xinqiaoensis Zhuo Yang, Hong-Zhang Zhou, 2012 c g

Data sources: i = ITIS, c = Catalogue of Life, g = GBIF, b = Bugguide.net

References

Further reading

External links

 

Staphylininae